Perbrinckia scitula is a species of freshwater crabs of the family Gecarcinucidae that is endemic to Sri Lanka. the species is categorized as critically endangered by founders due to their two localities where not protected by law. Very small number can be found among human habitations. The species distributed along Mahaweli River basin, around Deltota and Talawakelle areas.

References

Gecarcinucoidea
Freshwater crustaceans of Asia
Crustaceans of Sri Lanka
Endemic fauna of Sri Lanka
Crustaceans described in 1995